Kalyanpur Assembly constituency was an assembly constituency in Howrah district in the Indian state of West Bengal.

Overview
As a consequence of the orders of the Delimitation Commission, while Uluberia Purba Assembly constituency came into existence in 2011, Kalyanpur Assembly constituency ceased to exist from the same year.

Kalyanpur Assembly constituency was part of Uluberia (Lok Sabha constituency).

Members of Legislative Assembly

Election results

1977-2006
In the 2006 West Bengal Legislative Assembly election Rabindranath Mitra of CPI(M) won the 174 Kalyanpur assembly seat defeating Asit Mitra of Congress. Asit Mitra of Congress won the seat defeating Rabindranath Mitra of CPI(M) in 2001 and Maqsud Ahmed of CPI(M) in 1996. Nitai Charan Adak of CPI(M) defeated Sakti Sadhan Chowdhury of Congress in 1991, Asit Mitra representing Congress in 1987 and ICS in 1982, and Arabinda Roy of Janata Party in 1977.

1967-1972
Ali Ansari of CPI won in 1972. Nitai Adak of CPI(M) won in 1971. Sunil Kumar Mitra of Bangla Congress won in 1969 and 1967.

References

Former assembly constituencies of West Bengal
Politics of Howrah district
1967 establishments in West Bengal
2011 disestablishments in India
Constituencies established in 1967
Constituencies disestablished in 2011